The 2008 European Archery Championships is  the 20th edition of the European Archery Championships. The event was held in Vittel, France from 13 to 17 May, 2008.

Medal table

Medal summary

Recurve

Compound

References

External links
 Results

European Archery Championships
European Archery Championships
International archery competitions hosted by Italy
European Archery Championships
European Archery Championships
European Archery Championships